Helsingin Jalkapalloklubi, commonly known as HJK Helsinki, or simply as HJK, is a professional football club based in Helsinki, Finland. The club competes in the Finnish Veikkausliiga. Founded in 1907, the club has spent most of its history in the top tier of Finnish football. The club's home ground is the 10,770-seat Bolt Arena, where they have played since 2000.

Generally considered as Finland's biggest club, HJK is the most successful Finnish club in terms of championship titles with 32. The club has also won 14 Finnish Cups and 5 Finnish League Cups. Many of Finland's most successful players have played for HJK before moving abroad. The club has also similar success with women's Kansallinen Liiga.

HJK is the only Finnish club that has participated in the UEFA Champions League group stage. In 1998, they beat Metz in the play-off round to clinch their place in the competition for the following season. HJK have also participated twice in the group stages of the UEFA Europa League in 2014–15 and 2022–23 respectively, along with appearing the inaugural edition of the UEFA Conference League. The club's highest score in a European competition came during the 2011–12 season, with a 13–0 aggregate victory over Welsh champions Bangor City, which included a 10–0 home win.

HJK's traditional kit colours have long been blue and white striped shirts with blue shorts and socks. The club's crest has been nearly untouched for a century, it has only undergone one minor font change in order to modernize it.

History
The club was founded as Helsingin Jalkapalloklubi – Helsingfors Fotbollsklubb in 1907 by Fredrik Wathén. The founding meeting was held at a bowling alley in Kaisaniemi Park in May. The first ever competitive fixture was played against Ekenäs IF in Ekenäs. HJK won 2–4.

Early on, HJK became popular amongst Finnish-speaking students, while Swedish-speaking students preferred to play mainly for Unitas or HIFK. In late 1908, after a heated debate, the language was switched to unilingually Finnish and this resulted in many Swedish-speaking members switching over to HIFK and other clubs, although a few chose to stay.

In 1909, the colours blue and white were chosen to support the fennoman movement and bandy was introduced as the club's second official sport. The club moved from Kaisaniemi Ground to the new Eläintarha Stadium. At the end of the year, Fredrik Wathen was forced to leave his post as the club's chairman due to illness.

In 1910, Lauri Tanner became the longest-running club chairman to date. The same year, the club's first international match was played, against Eriksdals IF from Stockholm in Kaisaniemi. The first championship title was won in 1911. In 1915, the club moved to newly build Töölön Pallokenttä. In 1916, tennis was introduced as the third official sport in HJK, and it was played in the club until the early 1920s. During the Finnish Civil War in 1918, two HJK club members, fighting for the "Whites", were killed.

In 1921, the first bandy championship was won and during the following five seasons, HJK reached five finals, winning three more titles. Bowling was added to the club's repertoire in 1925, but the bowlers formed their own club, Helsingin Keilaajat, the following year. In 1928, ice hockey became an official sport and the first championship was won in 1929. League format was introduced to Finnish football in 1930 but HJK failed to qualify for the first season. In 1931, HJK played their first season in the league, however at the end of the season, they were relegated.

During World War II, HJK lost 22 members serving in the military, of which nine fell in the Winter War, twelve in the Continuation War and one in the Lapland War. In 1943, handball was introduced as the club's sixth official sport. HJK won one silver and two bronze medals in handball during the following three seasons but did not gain further success. Handball was first of HJK's sports where women also competed. The women's team played a total of 22 seasons at the highest level; their highest finish was fourth.

In 1963, HJK played their last ever season in the second level of the football pyramid, winning 20 out of 22 matches and scoring 127 goals. In 1964, the newly promoted club won their tenth championship title and the following season, in 1965–66, they played their first European Cup match, against Manchester United at the Helsinki Olympic Stadium. However, a 2–9 aggregate loss resulted in HJK's elimination from the competition.

In 1966, the club secured their first ever cup title by winning KTP 6–1 in the final in front of 7,000 spectators. Bandy section was disbanded in the late 1960s. The last official sport, figure skating, was added into the club's repertoire in 1966, was abolished in 1972. The ice hockey section was also disbanded in 1972 and the last season in handball was played in 1978. Hereafter, HJK therefore only participated in football following 69 years as a multisport club.

The 1998–99 season saw HJK become the first and, to date, only Finnish club to play in the group stage of the UEFA Champions League after defeating Metz in the second qualifying round. The club also managed a respectable five points in their group, defeating Benfica at home and earning draws at home to 1. FC Kaiserslautern and away to Benfica. They lost to PSV twice and to Kaiserslautern away.

The club's current home stadium, the Bolt Arena, was opened in 2000. The 20th championship title was won in 2002 and in 2008, the club won its tenth Finnish Cup title. The 2009 season was the start of a championship run that resulted in six titles in a row from 2009 to 2014.

In 2014, HJK became the first Finnish club to play in the UEFA Europa League group stage after defeating Rapid Wien in the play-off round. HJK, with wins over Torino and Copenhagen at home, finished third in their group with six points.

HJK made several acquisitions during the winter of 2015, including Córdoba forward Mike Havenaar, J-league playmaker Atomu Tanaka and Birmingham City holding midfielder Guy Moussi. With the new signings on their side, HJK began the season on a high by winning the league cup, a feat they had not accomplished since 1998. HJK also played its first local derby against HIFK since April 1972, drawing 1–1. However, HJK could not replicate the league success they had enjoyed for the last six seasons, finishing the 2015 season in third place, behind champions SJK and runners-up RoPS.

During the 2017 campaign the club lost only three games, which resulted in a domestic double.

Crest and colours

Badge
In 1910, HJK arranged competition to find a crest for club, but the club board wasn't happy with the proposals. The crest was finally designed by Osmo Korvenkontio in 1913, it has only gone through minor changes during history.

Colours
First kit of HJK was plain white shirt, black shorts and black socks with few white horizontal stripes on top. In 1909 HJK introduced its trademark blue and white striped shirt. Blue and white colours were homage to fennoman movement. Black trunks still remained for decades. Shirt was changed to unicolour blue for season 1973 due to pressure from sponsors. In attempt to professionalize hockey department club had fallen in to financial despair and sponsors demanded more visibility for their logos. Clubs financial situation had improved by 1986 and due fans demands shirt was changed back to striped by the end of the year and has remained so ever since.

Honours

Football
Veikkausliiga:
Winners (32): 1911, 1912, 1917, 1918, 1919, 1923, 1925, 1936, 1938, 1964, 1973, 1978, 1981, 1985, 1987, 1988, 1990, 1992, 1997, 2002, 2003, 2009, 2010, 2011, 2012, 2013, 2014, 2017, 2018, 2020, 2021, 2022
Runners-up (14): 1921, 1933, 1937, 1939, 1956, 1965, 1966, 1982, 1983, 1999, 2001, 2005, 2006, 2016
Finnish Cup:
Winners (14): 1966, 1981, 1984, 1993, 1996, 1998, 2000, 2003, 2006, 2008, 2011, 2014, 2016–17, 2020
Runners-up (6): 1975, 1985, 1990, 1994, 2010, 2021
Finnish League Cup:
Winners (5): 1994, 1996, 1997, 1998, 2015
Runners-up (3): 1995, 2009, 2012

Women's football
Finnish Women's Championship:
Winners (23): 1971, 1972, 1973, 1974, 1975, 1979, 1980, 1981, 1984, 1986, 1987, 1988, 1991. 1992, 1995, 1996, 1997, 1998, 1999, 2000, 2001, 2005, 2019
Finnish Women's Cup:
Winners (17): 1981, 1984, 1985, 1986, 1991, 1992, 1993, 1998, 1999, 2000, 2002, 2006, 2007, 2008, 2010, 2017, 2019

Ice hockey

Finnish Championship:
Winners (3): 1928–29, 1931–32, 1934–35
Runners-up (6): 1930–31, 1932–33, 1937–38, 1938–39, 1940–41, 1971–72
Finnish Cup:
Winners (1): 1970

Bandy
Finnish Championship:
Winners (5): 1921, 1923, 1924, 1928, 1937
Runners-up (3): 1925, 1927, 1946

Figure skating
Finnish Champions
Pia Wingisaar: 1966, 1967
Anuliisa Numminen: 1970
Tarja Säde: 1971
Tarja Näsi: 1972

League history

Season to season
81 seasons in Veikkausliiga / SM-Sarja
6 seasons in Ykkönen / Suomisarja

Supporters and rivalries

Historically HJK had a wide support within Finnish speaking, prosperous middle class of Helsinki. The club's supporters were often nationalistic after the fashion of almost every other Finnish FA club at the time. Leftist working class' clubs played their own leagues and competitions under the Finnish Workers' Sports Federation. However, The club remained open to all 'honorable citizens' regardless of their native language, race or social class, and always had members from other communities as well. Before the 1970s HJK came to be known especially as a Töölöan club due to most of their activity taking place in this particular district.

During recent decades the club's old image as a prosperous, middle class group from Töölö has largely disappeared due to social changes in Finland as well as migration from inner city to housing projects built during the mass migration from the countryside during the 1960s and the 1970s.

The Helsinki Derby and other local rivalries
HJK's main rivals in Helsinki were widely considered to be Kiffen, HPS and HIFK. In the past these were the four big clubs from Helsinki. The clubs were mainly separated by language, HJK and HPS being Finnish speaking clubs whereas HIFK and KIF were Swedish speaking. These four clubs competed also in bandy, ice hockey and handball. The support for HJK mainly came from around the inner city and after 1940s also from Töölö, in its early years HPS Support came from same areas as HJK. Later in 1940s and 1950s when HJK support shifted more towards Töölö area, HPS gained more support in Vallila and Alppila districts, this was mostly due their youth activities taking part in those particular areas, these boundaries were not strict however and each of the four clubs had support, players and members across the city. HJK were already founding youth teams to new suburbs in 1960s and their reputation as a Töölöan club was short lived. KIF and HPS were both struggling to survive and were both relegated to lower leagues after 1964 season and rapidly lost their support. KIF made a brief two season stint to first level in 1977–78. While both KIF and HPS are still active as of 2020, they have spend their recent decades playing in lower levels, HPS focusing more on youth football in northern Helsinki.

HJK and HIFK share the biggest rivalry being two of the oldest and most successful clubs. Both were also successful in Bandy which was major winter sport in the first half of the 20th century, KIF and HPS gained lesser success. Also in Ice Hockey clubs faced numerous times and played more seasons in first level than HPS or KIF. A match between these two clubs is called as Stadin derby. Language was the biggest separating factor between the clubs, HIFK was the club of choice for the Swedish speaking population of the city and HJK for the Finnish speaking. In 2015 HIFK was promoted back to the top flight after 40 years of struggling in the lower leagues having played their last season in the top division in 1972. Since HJK ceased their activity in other sports during the 1960s and 1970s the rivalry faded away on a large scale and in recent decades many even supported both clubs at the same time, HJK in football and HIFK in ice hockey. However, due to the rise of the Finnish supporter scene in the 2000s, there is a high tension between the most vocal supporters.

HJK shared a short but fierce rivalry with FC Jokerit around the late 1990s and the early 2000s. Jokerit were well supported due to their popular ice hockey section and the clubs also competed against each other in ice hockey in the late 1960s and the early 1970s.

Multiple Helsinki based clubs have played in the league but due to their short term visits and relatively low support base large scale rivalries were never born. Some notable clubs were Ponnistus, FinnPa, Pallo-Pojat and Helsingin Toverit.

Helsinki-Lahti rivalry
HJK has competed against Lahti based clubs from the 1960s, between 1964 and 1980 HJK and Lahden Reipas had a minor rivalry as both clubs gained good success winning some titles and were also generally well supported. Reipas also won seven cup titles against one of HJK. Reipas was relegated after 1980 season. More notable rivalry was against Kuusysi from the early 1980s to the mid-1990s. Between 1981 and 1992 HJK won six league titles against Kuusysi's five, both clubs also won the cup twice, facing two times in the finals (which were both won by HJK). Both clubs also performed well in the European competitions. In 1996 both the Lahti clubs merged and FC Lahti was born, HJK and FC Lahti matches are more known from outside pitch activities, some crowd disturbances and small fights have occurred which otherwise are rare in Finnish football. Due to a relatively short distance between the two cities, these matches often draw more notable away support than others.

HJK-Haka rivalry
HJK and Valkeakosken Haka are the two most successful clubs in Finnish football, HJK with 27 league and 12 cup titles and Haka with 9 league and 12 cup titles. The match is also considered as "urban vs. rural" rivalry as HJK is a club from Finland's biggest city Helsinki and Haka is representing the small town of Valkeakoski.

Players

First team squad

Out on loan

Klubi 04

HJK's reserve team currently plays in the Finnish second Division.

Management and boardroom

Management
Updated 22 June 2022

Performance Unit
Also with Women's team and Reserve team.
Updated 30 March 2022

Boardroom
Updated 22 January 2021

Managers and Captains

Managers

 Yrjö Larha (1933–1944)
 Eino Nuutinen (1945–1947)
 George Duke (1948–1949)
 Eino Nuutinen (1950)
 János Nagy (1951)
 Eino Nuutinen (1952)
 Niilo Nordman (1953–1955)
 Aatos Lehtonen (1956–1958)
 Aulis Rytkönen (1960–1971)
 Raimo Kauppinen (1 January 1972 – 1974)
 Kai Pahlman (1973–1974)
 Aulis Rytkönen (1 July 1975 – 1979)
 Raimo Kauppinen (1975–31 December 1979)
 Martti Kuusela (1 January 1980 – 31 December 1981)
 Raimo Kauppinen (1 January 1981 – 1982)
 Thure Sarnola (1982)
 Miikka Toivola (1983–1984)
 Jyrki Heliskoski (1 January 1985 – 31 December 1989)
 Martti Kuusela (1 January 1990 – 31 December 1990)
 Jyrki Nieminen (1 January 1991 – 31 December 1991)
 Jari-Pekka Keurulainen (1 January 1992 – 31 December 1994)
 Bo Johansson (1 January 1995 – 31 December 1995)
 Tommy Lindholm (1 January 1996 – 8 July 1996)
 Jari-Pekka Keurulainen,  Martti Kuusela (8 July 1996 – 31 December 1996)
 Antti Muurinen (1 January 1997 – 31 December 1999)
 Jyrki Heliskoski (1 January 2000 – 31 December 2001)
  Keith Armstrong (1 January 2002 – 5 September 2007)
 Aki Hyryläinen (6 September 2007 – 10 October 2007)
 Antti Muurinen (10 October 2007 – 31 December 2012)
 Sixten Boström (1 Jan 2013–28 April 2014)
 Mika Lehkosuo (29 April 2014 – 22 May 2019)
 Toni Koskela (22 May 2019–)

Captains

 Mika Nurmela (2007)
 Tuomas Aho (2008)
 Tuomas Haapala (2009)
 Ville Wallén (2010-2013)
 Teemu Tainio (2014)
 Markus Heikkinen (2015)
 Sebastian Sorsa (2016)
 Rafinha (2017-2018)
 Sebastian Dahlström (2019)
 Nikolai Alho (2020)
 Daniel O'Shaughnessy (2021)
 Miro Tenho (2022)

European campaigns

UEFA club competition record
Updated 6 August 2019.

UEFA Club Ranking
This is the current UEFA Club Ranking.

References

External links

Official website 
Klubipääty – supporters 
Forza HJK – fan club 

 
Football clubs in Helsinki
1907 establishments in Finland
Association football clubs established in 1907
Bandy clubs established in 1907
Defunct bandy clubs in Finland